The 1987 Copa América Final was the final match to decide the champion of the 1987 Copa América, the 33rd. edition of this continental competition. It was held on July 12, 1987, in Estadio Monumental in Buenos Aires. Uruguay beat Chile 1–0, achieving their 13th Copa América title.

Qualified teams

Route to the final

Background 
Uruguay had eliminated Argentina (reigning World Champion by then) based in their good defense and tactical order. As former defender and Olympic champion José Nasazzi stated, "We make the first 10 fouls of the match and then we win playing fair", that phrase synthesized the Uruguayan rough style of play to prevail psychologically over the rival since the first minute of the match.

Under that premise, defensive players Obdulio Trasante and José Perdomo applied that rough tactics during the first minutes, carrying the Argentine side to that style of play, confusing their rival. Once the first objective was fulfilled, Uruguay started to play fair, keeping the possession of the ball until the match ended.

The match

In the decisive match played at Estadio Monumental of Buenos Aires, Chile played dirty, committing a great amount of fouls, with Enzo Francescoli as one of their main victims. Because of that rough style of playing, defender Eduardo Gómez was sent off by Brazilian referee Romualdo Arpi Filho with before the 15 minutes of the match.

Nevertheless, Francascoli would be also sent off after fouling rival Fernando Astengo. Uruguay won the final through the highlighted performances of Alfonso Domínguez (who controlled the movements of Ivo Basay, Chile's most notable forward), and central midfielder José Perdomo, who played both, defensive and offensive positions.

Match details

References

Final, 1987 Copa America
1987
1987
Copa América finals
Uruguay at the 1987 Copa América
1987 in Chilean football
1987
Sports competitions in Buenos Aires
1980s in Buenos Aires
July 1987 sports events in South America